The Camel's Back is the third album by Psapp.

"The Monster Song" was released as the album's first single on 3 November 2008 in the UK.  "I Want That" was released as the second single in the UK on 30 March 2009.

Track listing

Personnel
Psapp
Carim Clasmann
Galia Durant

Additional personnel
Alessandro Antonio Palmitessa – saxophone, "I Want That" and "Marshrat"
Bekah Nelson – additional strings, "Part Like Waves"
The Elysium Quartett – additional strings, "Part Like Waves"
Anna-Maria Smerd – violin
Jana Mishenina – violin
Gabrielle Kancachian – viola
Felicia Meric – cello
Chris Walmsley – additional percussion, "Fix It" and "Mister Ant"
Shawn Lee – unspecified noises, "Homicide"
Pete Norman – mastering

Alternate versions
In addition to the bonus track listed above, the iTunes versions available in most regions outside of the United States include an exclusive 16-page booklet.
As with Psapp's The Only Thing I Ever Wanted, a two-disc promotional version was produced in the UK. The first disc is identical to the commercial release, while the second disc contains all of the album tracks with the vocals removed where applicable. Both discs are marked "Not for Sale."

Notes
The first track from the album that Psapp made public on their MySpace page was "I Want That."  It was later replaced by "Part Like Waves."
The first video to be released was "The Monster Song."  The video was made in conjunction with Stephen Irwin, features artwork created by Durant, and can be seen here.
The title of "Mister Ant" was taken from an incident in which Durant's sister, a teacher, gave her name as "Miss Durant," to which a student replied, "Why are you called 'Mister Ant' when you're a woman?"
"Homicide" is essentially an extended version of the underlying sounds heard during the outro to Psapp's recording of David Shrigley and Psapp's "Sad Song."

References

External links
Psapp official website
The Camel's Back at Domino Records
Psapp at Domino Records

2008 albums
Experimental pop albums
Domino Recording Company albums
Psapp albums
Electronica albums